The  is a railway line owned and operated by the Kintetsu Railway, a Japanese private railway company, connecting Ōji Station (Nara) (Ōji, Nara Prefecture) and Nishi-Tawaramoto Station (Tawaramoto, Nara Prefecture) in Japan.

The line does not connect directly with other Kintetsu Lines, however both terminals are located within walking distance of nearby Kintetsu stations on other lines.

History
The Yamato Railway Co. opened the Shin-Oji - Nishi-Tawaramoto section in 1918 as a 1067mm gauge line, extending the line to Sakurai on current Kintetsu Osaka Line in 1923. Services on the Nishi-Tawaramoto - Sakurai section ceased in 1944 as a war-time austerity measure, with the section formally closing in 1958. The right-of-way for this section was subsequently converted to a road, as Nara Prefectural Route 14.

The Shin-Oji - Nishi-Tawaramoto section was regauged to 1435mm and electrified at 600 VDC in 1948, and the company merged with Kintetsu in 1964. The line voltage was increased to 1500 VDC in 1969.

Stations

Tawaramoto Line
Rail transport in Nara Prefecture
Standard gauge railways in Japan
Railway lines opened in 1918